Lower Beulah is a rural locality in the local government area (LGA) of Kentish in the North-west and west LGA region of Tasmania. The 2016 census recorded a population of 55 for the state suburb of Lower Beulah.

History 
Lower Beulah was gazetted as a locality in 1965. 

The name Beulah is Biblical in origin It is believed to mean, among other things, “the gates of heaven”. Gold was once mined in the locality.

Geography
The Mersey River forms part of the eastern boundary. The Dasher River, a tributary of the Mersey, forms a small part of the northern boundary. The Minnow River forms part of the western boundary before flowing through to form part of the eastern, where it then joins the Dasher at the north-east corner.

Road infrastructure 
Route C159 (Lower Beulah Road / Dynans Bridge Road) runs from the north-west to the village in the centre, and then to the east, where it exits. Route C157, a continuation of Lower Beulah Road, runs west from the village until it exits.

References

Towns in Tasmania
Localities of Kentish Council